Jorma Paukku (20 May 1945 – 1 May 2016) was a Finnish diplomat and a foreign affairs counselor .

Paukku was born in Pielisjärvi. He was a Finnish ambassador from 2002 to 2007 to Dar es Salaam, Tanzania and was also accredited as Ambassador to Zambia, Burundi, Rwanda and the Democratic Republic of the Congo. He died in Espoo aged 70.

References 

1945 births
2016 deaths
Ambassadors of Finland to Tanzania
Ambassadors of Finland to Zambia
Ambassadors of Finland to Burundi
Ambassadors of Finland to Rwanda
Ambassadors of Finland to the Democratic Republic of the Congo